Alexandrovka is a rural locality (a selo) and the administrative center of Alexandrovskoye Rural Settlement, Talovsky District, Voronezh Oblast, Russia. The population was 797 as of 2010. There are 5 streets.

Geography 
Alexandrovka is located 17 km north of Talovaya (the district's administrative centre) by road. Krasny is the nearest rural locality.

References 

Rural localities in Talovsky District